Queen Margaret College was a women-only higher education institution based in North Park House in Glasgow, Scotland.

History
The idea of a college arose as the result of English literature lectures for women that were suggested by Janet "Jessie" Campbell to Professor John Nichol of the University of Glasgow. The Glasgow Association for the Higher Education of Women was established, as women were not at the time permitted to study at Scottish universities. The first secretary of the College was Janet Anne Galloway.

The College was named for Queen Margaret of Scotland, and at the time was the only such college in the country. North Park House, built between 1869 and 1871 for John and Matthew Bell, owners of the Glasgow Pottery, was purchased by Isabella Elder, a local philanthropist and wife of the shipbuilder John Elder, to house the College, which moved into the premises adjacent to the University's Botanic Gardens in 1883.

A proposal to provide medical courses for women was made in 1889 with the financial backing of Mrs Isabella Elder. A formal motion was adopted at the Annual General Meeting of the college on 28 April 1890  Classes in the study of medicine commenced for 13 students in the winter session of 1890/1891.

A new Medical Hall  was built in 1895, designed by John Keppie with input by Charles Rennie Mackintosh. The funding for the erection of this purpose-built facility  came from the Bellahouston Trust which had been established for charitable, religious and educational purposes in the city. Keppie and Mackintosh's building was formally opened on 18 November 1895 by Rev. John Caird, Principal of the University of Glasgow.

The College merged with the University of Glasgow in 1892, although the premises continued to be used solely for the education of women until being sold to BBC Scotland in 1935, who moved from premises in West George Street. Queen Margaret College leaves a strong legacy within the University, in the form of the Queen Margaret Union, Queen Margaret Settlement, and Queen Margaret Halls of Residence in Kelvinside.

Notable alumni and staff
Janet Anne Galloway, first secretary.
Frances Melville, second secretary.
Jessie Campbell founder
Dr Marion Gilchrist: first woman to graduate from the University of Glasgow and first woman to graduate in medicine from a Scottish University
Violet Mary Craig Roberton: one of the first women to be elected as a councillor in Glasgow
Mary Anderson Snodgrass: suffragist and one of the first women to be elected as councillor in Glasgow
John Adam Cramb: historian (lecturer 1888-1890)
James Hogarth Pringle (lecturer)

Queen Margaret Union
In 1890, the students of the College founded the Queen Margaret Union to cater for social and cultural activities. The Union was originally housed in the College's basement until 1906, when the College's growth meant the space was required for teaching. The Union subsequently occupied accommodation at 31 Buckingham Terrace, close to the College building, the former College Club at 67 Ann Street (now Southpark Terrance), a house at 1 University Gardens and the John McIntyre Building, before finally acquiring a home of its own at 22 University Gardens in 1968. Following several requests from male students wishing to join, the Union amended its constitution in 1979 to permit men to become members. The GUU followed two years later.

The archives for the Queen Margaret College are maintained by the Archives of the University of Glasgow (GUAS).

See also
 Edinburgh Association for the University Education of Women

References

External links 
Charles Rennie Mackintosh – Glasgow Buildings

Educational institutions established in 1868
Defunct universities and colleges in Scotland
Former women's universities and colleges in the United Kingdom
1868 establishments in Scotland
1892 disestablishments in Scotland
Educational institutions disestablished in 1892